Isorrhoa loxoschema is a moth in the family Cosmopterigidae. It was described by Turner in 1923. It is found in Australia.

References

Natural History Museum Lepidoptera generic names catalog

Cosmopteriginae
Moths described in 1923